Peckinpah: An Ultraviolent Romance (2009) is a short critifictional novel by American author D. Harlan Wilson. It is a series of vignettes, folk tales and pseudobiographical sketches covering two stories, one about a man named Felix Soandso who seeks vengeance on a gang of exploitation film villains after they kill his wife, the other about the life of filmmaker Sam Peckinpah.

While the novel did not receive any awards, it was endorsed by Alan Moore, who called it "a bludgeoning celluloid rush of language and ideas served from an action-painter's bucket" and "an incendiary gem." HorrorNews.Net, however, described it as, "an empty intellectual exercise" and suggested that, "This is what happens when authors try too hard to be Literate and don’t put the story above their ego."

References

2009 American novels
Novels by D. Harlan Wilson
Novels set in Indiana
2000s horror novels
American horror novels
2009 fantasy novels
American fantasy novels
Metafictional novels
Postmodern novels